XHCPN-FM is a radio station on 101.7 FM in Piedras Negras, Coahuila, Mexico. It is owned by Grupo Radiorama and carries its Arroba FM (@FM) contemporary hit radio format.

History
XHCPN began as XECPN-AM 1320, receiving its concession on November 14, 1988. It was then owned by Víctor Nasip Harb Karam. In February 1999, Karam traded XECPN to Radiorama in order to acquire XEMDA-AM in Monclova.

It migrated to FM in 2011.

References

Radio stations in Coahuila